Hubertus Bengsch (born 10 July 1952 in Berlin) is a German actor, best known for his role as the German First Officer (1WO) in Das Boot.
He also is well known for being the German voice of American actor Richard Gere.

Filmography

External links
 

German male film actors
Living people
1952 births
Male actors from Berlin
German male voice actors